A Disney Halloween may refer to:

 "A Disney Halloween" (Walt Disney)
 A Disney Halloween (1983 special)